11/4 may refer to:
November 4 (month-day date notation)
April 11 (day-month date notation)
11 shillings and 4 pence in UK predecimal currency
A type of hendecagram

See also
114 (disambiguation)
4/11 (disambiguation)